The 2013–14 Columbia Lions men's basketball team represented Columbia University during the 2013–14 NCAA Division I men's basketball season. The Lions, led by fourth year head coach Kyle Smith, played their home games at Levien Gymnasium and were members of the Ivy League. They finished the season 21–13, 8–6 in Ivy League play to finish in a tie for third place. They were invited to the CollegeInsdier.com Tournament where they defeated Valparaiso and Eastern Michigan to advance to the quarterfinals where they lost to fellow Ivy League member Yale.

Roster

Schedule

|-
!colspan=9 style="background:#75b2dd; color:#FFFFFF;"| Regular season

|-
!colspan=9 style="background:#75b2dd; color:#FFFFFF;"| CIT

References

Columbia Lions men's basketball seasons
Columbia
Columbia
Lions
Lions